Norbert Klein (25 October 1866 in Brunzeif, Austrian Silesia – 10 March 1933 in Bruntál, Czechoslovakia) was Bishop of Brno from 1916 to 1926 and 59th Grand Master of the Teutonic Order from 1923 to 1933.

Life
Klein began his theological studies in 1885 at Olomouc. He continued for two years before entering the novitiate of the Teutonic Order in 1887. On 27 July 1890 he was ordained to the priesthood and in 1892 he made his solemn profession in the order. In 1903 he was named Prior of Opava. On 7 December 1916 he was appointed to be Bishop of Brno. On 28 January 1917 he was ordained bishop. On 30 April 1923 he became the first clerical grand master of the Teutonic Order when Archduke Eugen of Austria resigned in order to ensure that the order retained its properties in Austria and Czechoslovakia which were threatened with confiscation by the respective governments. On 4 January 1926 Klein resigned as Bishop of Brno and was named Titular Bishop of Syene.

Klein died on 10 March 1933, and is buried in Bruntál.

1866 births
1933 deaths
Grand Masters of the Teutonic Order
Roman Catholic bishops in Czechoslovakia
People from Bruntál District
People from Austrian Silesia
Moravian-German people
Clergy from Brno